Spongipellis is a genus of fungi in the family Polyporaceae. The genus is widely distributed and contains ten species. The genus was circumscribed by French mycologist Narcisse Théophile Patouillard in 1887. The genus name combines the Latin words spongia ("sponge") and pellis ("skin").

Species
, Index Fungorum accepts ten species of Spongipellis:
S. africana Ipulet & Ryvarden (2005) – Uganda
S. caseosus  (Pat.) Ryvarden (1983)
S. chubutensis  J.E.Wright & J.R.Deschamps (1972)
S. delectans (Peck) Murrill (1907)
S. hypococcineus  (Berk.) Pat. (1900)
S. labyrinthicus  (Fr.) Pat. (1900)
S. litschaueri  Lohwag (1931) – Czech Republic
S. malicola  (Lloyd) Ginns (1984)
S. subcretaceus  (Lloyd) Decock, P.K.Buchanan & Ryvarden (2000)
S. unicolor  (Fr.) Murrill (1907)
 S. pachyodon

References

Further reading

Polyporaceae
Polyporales genera
Taxa described in 1874
Taxa named by Narcisse Théophile Patouillard